Google AI is a division of Google dedicated to artificial intelligence. It was announced at Google I/O 2017 by CEO Sundar Pichai.

Projects
 Serving cloud-based TPUs (tensor processing units) in order to develop machine learning software.
 Development of TensorFlow.
 The TPU research cloud provides free access to a cluster of cloud TPUs to researchers engaged in open-source machine learning research.
 Portal to over 5500 (as of September 2019) research publications by Google staff.
 Magenta: a deep learning research team exploring the role of machine learning as a tool in the creative process. The team has released many open source projects allowing artists and musicians to extend their processes using AI.
Sycamore: a new 54-qubit programmable quantum processor.
LaMDA: a family of conversational neural language models
A program designed to address the growing need for developing free speech resources for under-represented languages

References

Further reading 

 Google Puts All Of Their A.I. Stuff On Google.ai, Announces Cloud TPU
 Google collects its AI initiatives under Google.ai
 Google collects AI-based services across the company into Google.ai – "Google.ai is a collection of products and teams across Alphabet with a focus on AI."
 Google's deep focus on AI is paying off

External links

Google
Artificial intelligence
2022 controversies in the United States